The Tempodrom (also referred to as Neues Tempodrom) is a multi-purpose event venue in Berlin.

Founded by Irene Moessinger, it opened in 1980 next to the Berlin Wall on the west side of Potsdamer Platz, housed in a large circus tent. After several changes of location it is now housed in a permanent building in the Kreuzberg neighborhood.

History
Moessinger had recently become a nurse when she came into an 800,000 mark inheritance from her father; it was this bequest that she used to start the Tempodrom in a circus tent. Her initial funds were quickly exhausted and the following year the Berlin Senate agreed to contribute funds to keep the operation going.

The original location attracted noise complaints, and in 1985 the Tempodrom moved to a site in the Tiergarten, where it remained until displaced by construction of the new German Chancellery. At this time a new construction of the current building was proposed, and the tents moved to a temporary site during construction. In May 1999, the venue moved to another temporary location near the Ostbahnhof.

In 2001, a permanent venue was finally constructed on the site of the old Anhalter Bahnhof, whose war-damaged ruins had been demolished in 1960. While a small section of the old station façade was retained (and is still standing), the entire train shed was removed, leaving a large open area. The new Tempodrom was erected in the center of this area, with a playing field lying between it and the façade remnant, and a wooded area extending in the other direction towards the Landwehr Canal. The firm of von Gerkan, Marg und Partner (GMP) was retained to design the new building. The basic floor plan is square, accommodating three performance spaces as well as a bistro and various offices and restrooms, underneath a wooden-floored terrace which hosts a beer garden in season. The two arenas are both circular, with the larger, centrally located space covered by a  steel and concrete panel roof intended to echo the form of the tents of the original site. This space can accommodate 3,500 patrons; the smaller arena seats 400. The third space is the "Liquidrom", a thermal bath/spa establishment featuring a  diameter salt water bath fitted with underwater speakers to provide a multi-sensory spa experience, three saunas at temperatures of 55, 80 and 90 degrees Celsius, a steam bath room along with various massage services. The  building was completed in 2001 at a cost of nearly $36 million, over twice the original budget. Scandal over the overruns led to the resignation of State Senator , who was in charge of the Urban Development department.

The Tempodrom corporation went into bankruptcy in 2005 and was operated by a receiver, with Moessinger retiring as director. She and  former Director Norbert Waehl were tried for embezzlement but were acquitted in 2008. The Tempodrom is now operated by the Bremer KPS Group, who took over in April 2010 in the face of a foreclosure threat by Landesbank Berlin.

Tempodrom continues in operation and hosts a wide variety of events.

Notable performers

Alanis Morissette
Amy Macdonald
Backstreet Boys
Bastille
Björk
Celtic Woman
The Cure
Fugazi
Harry Styles
Iggy Pop
James Taylor
Jamie-Lee
Janet Jackson
Joan Baez
Josh Groban
Keane
Kylie Minogue
Lorde
Leona Lewis
The Lumineers
Matt White
Monsta X
Niall Horan
Nick Cave and the Bad Seeds
Nicki Minaj
Norah Jones
Olly Murs
Pet Shop Boys
Ramones
Roger Hodgson
Sade
Severina
Snow Patrol
Donna Summer
Take That
Tangerine Dream
Tears for Fears
Tori Amos
Troye Sivan
Vanessa Mai
Vasco Rossi
Zara Larsson

Notable events
German Masters, snooker tournament

References

External links

Music venues in Germany
Buildings and structures in Berlin
Venues of the Bundesvision Song Contest
Sports venues in Berlin
1980 architecture
2001 architecture